The Willamette locomotive was a geared steam locomotive of the Shay locomotive type, built by the Willamette Iron and Steel Works of Portland, Oregon. After key patents on the Shay locomotive had expired, it was possible for other manufacturers to produce Shay "clones".

The Willamette locomotive was very similar to a Shay, but had many differences, as the company that made them intended on making an "improved Shay", even though the "Pacific Coast Shay", later made by Lima, took up many of the features on the Willamette. The differences were:

All Willamettes were equipped with superheaters, while Shays usually were not.
The boiler parts were riveted together, instead of being bolted together.
The Willamette locomotive used Walschaerts valve gear driving piston valves, while the Shay mainly used Stephenson valve gear driving slide valves.
The truck design was completely redone and rode much smoother.
The rear cylinder on the Willamette was facing the same direction as the rest of the cylinders, while the two front cylinders on a Shay faced forward, with the rear cylinder facing backwards.
The back cylinder on a Willamette was moved forward of the cab, while in a Shay, the back cylinder was almost protruding into the cab.
The valve chests were turned outward.
In a test done between a Shay and a Willamette, the Shay pulled 27 empty cars, while the Willamette pulled 29 empty cars, as well as using 40% less fuel.

All but one Willamette burned oil, despite their working for logging companies, where wood would be abundant. Oil burners produced few sparks, however, and were less likely to ignite a forest than coal- or wood-fired locomotives. The only coal-fired Willamette worked for Anaconda Copper.

Six Willamettes survive. Locomotive #2 was operational at the Mt. Rainier Scenic Railroad in Mineral, Washington, until the railroad temporarily shut down operations in 2020, but the line will soon be revived in 2025. Willamette Locomotive No. 7 is undergoing restoration at The Historical Museum of Fort Missoula in Missoula, Montana. Willamette Locomotive #21 is on display and can be viewed at Railroad Park Resort in Dunsmuir, California.

Further reading
 Hauff, Steve and Gertz, Jim, The Willamette Locomotive, Oso Publishing, August, 1997.

References

External links
Geared Steam Locomotive Works' Willamette pages
 Willamette Locomotive Roster/Search

Geared steam locomotives
Rail transportation in Oregon
Freight locomotives